"Where the Poor Boys Dance" is a song originally recorded by Lulu. It was released as a single from her later cancelled dance album and reached number 24 on the UK singles chart in March 2000. A new version of the song was included on her album Back on Track, released in 2004. The song was later recorded by Daryl Braithwaite and has been included as the first track on his 2005 album, Snapshot.

Track listing

Official versions
Album version (unreleased)
Almighty mix – 3:53
2004 version – 4:27 (Back on Track album version)

Charts

References

2000 singles
Lulu (singer) songs
Daryl Braithwaite songs
Songs written by David Tyson
2000 songs
Mercury Records singles
Songs written by Billy Lawrie
Songs written by Lulu (singer)